Paso Campamento is a village in the Artigas Department of northernUruguay.

Location

Population
According to the 2004 census, Paso Campamento had a population of 221 inhabitants.

References

External links
INE map of Paso Campamento

Populated places in the Artigas Department